Jaddour Hamadi Ben Haddou (1 January 1949 – 11 September 2022) was a Moroccan middle-distance runner. He competed in the men's 1500 metres at the 1968 Summer Olympics.

References

1949 births
2022 deaths
Moroccan male middle-distance runners
Moroccan male long-distance runners
Moroccan male cross country runners
Athletes (track and field) at the 1968 Summer Olympics
Olympic athletes of Morocco
People from Khemisset